Clavicornia were a former order of beetles. The genera in it have been reassigned to the following families:

 Nitidulidae
 Cucujidae
 Cryptophagidae
 Latridiidae
 Coccinellidae

The name comes from the shape of the antennae (Latin cornum or horn) that looks like a key (Latin clavis).

References 

Obsolete arthropod taxa
Beetles by classification